The Iranian ground jay (Podoces pleskei) or Pleske's ground jay, is a species of bird in the family Corvidae. It is endemic to Iran where it is known as Zaqboor in Farsi.

The species is named after Russian zoologist Theodor Pleske.

The Iranian ground jay body is baby brown type in colour. Their wings are striped in black and white. Their stick-like legs are very well balanced. They have beady, glossy eyes. Their beak is smooth and sharp. Their body is covered in short fur which makes their body look and feel fluffy.  

An Iranian ground jay usually lives in dry areas like deserts.
They are a well protected species in Iran.

References

Iranian ground jay
Birds of the Middle East
Endemic fauna of Iran
Iranian ground jay
Taxonomy articles created by Polbot